The album-equivalent unit, or album equivalent, is a measurement unit in music industry to define the consumption of music that equals the purchase of one album copy. This consumption includes streaming and song downloads in addition to traditional album sales. The album-equivalent unit was introduced in the mid-2010s as an answer to the drop of album sales in the 21st century. Album sales more than halved from 1999 to 2009, declining from a $14.6 to $6.3 billion industry. For instance, the only albums that went platinum in the United States in 2014 were the Frozen soundtrack and Taylor Swift's 1989, whereas several artists' works had in 2013.

The usage of the album-equivalent units revolutionized the charts from the "best-selling albums" ranking into the "most popular albums" ranking. The International Federation of the Phonographic Industry (IFPI) have used album-equivalent unit to measure their Global Recording Artist of the Year since 2013.

Terminology

The term album-equivalent unit had been used by the International Federation of the Phonographic Industry (IFPI) long before the streaming era began. Between 1994 and 2005, the IFPI counted three physical singles as an equivalent of one album unit in their annual Recording Industry in Numbers (RIN) report. The term was reintroduced by the IFPI in 2013 to measure their Global Recording Artist of the Year. By this point, the album-equivalent units had already included music downloads and streams. An alternative term of album equivalent unit is sales plus streaming (SPS) unit, which was introduced by Hits magazine.

Use on record charts and certifications

United States 
Beginning with the December 13, 2014 issue, the Billboard 200 albums chart revised its ranking methodology with album-equivalent unit instead of pure album sales. With this overhaul, the Billboard 200 includes on-demand streaming and digital track sales (as measured by Nielsen SoundScan) by way of a new algorithm, utilizing data from all of the major on-demand audio subscription services including Spotify, Apple Music, Google Play, YouTube and formerly Xbox Music. Known as TEA (track equivalent album) and SEA (streaming equivalent album) when originally implemented, 10 song sales or 1,500 song streams from an album were treated as equivalent to one purchase of the album. Billboard continues to publish a pure album sales chart, called Top Album Sales, that maintains the traditional Billboard 200 methodology, based exclusively on Nielsen SoundScan's sales data. Taylor Swift's 1989 was the first album to top the chart with this methodology, generating 339,000 album-equivalent units (281,000 units came from pure album sales). In Billboard's February 8, 2015, issue, Now That's What I Call Music! 53 became the first album in history to miss the top position of the Billboard 200 despite being the best-selling album of the week.

Similarly the Recording Industry Association of America, which had previously certified albums based on units sold to retail stores, began factoring streaming for their certifications in February 2016.

RIAA summary by format, in million copies per year.

In July 2018, Billboard and Nielsen revised the ratios used for streaming equivalent album units to account for the relative value of streams on paid music services like Apple Music or Amazon Music Unlimited versus ad-supported music and video platforms such as Spotify's free tier and YouTube. Under the updated album equivalent ratios, 1,250 premium audio streams, 3,750 ad-supported streams, or 3,750 video streams are equal to one album unit.

United Kingdom 
In the United Kingdom, the Official Charts Company has included streaming into the UK Albums Chart since March 2015. The change was decided after the massive growth of streaming; the number of tracks streamed in the UK in a year doubled from 7.5 billion in 2013 to just under 15 billion in 2014. Under the new methodology, Official Charts Company takes the 12 most-streamed tracks from an album, with the top two songs being given lesser weight so that the figure will reflect the popularity of the album as a whole rather than of one or two successful singles. The adjusted total is divided by 1000 and added to the album sales figure. Sam Smith's In the Lonely Hour was the first album to top the chart with this rule. Out of its 41,000 album-equivalent units, 2,900 units came from streaming and the rest were pure sales. By 2017, streaming had accounted more than half of album-equivalent units in the UK, according to British Phonographic Industry (BPI).

Germany 
In Germany, streaming began to be included on the albums chart since February 2016. Nevertheless, the German Albums Chart is used to rank the albums based on weekly revenue, instead of units. Hence, only paid streaming is counted and must be played at least 30 seconds. At least 6 tracks of one album have to be streamed to make streams count for the album, with 12 tracks being the maximum counted. Similar to the UK chart rule, the actual streams of the top-two songs are not counted, but instead the average of the following tracks.

Responses and criticism
According to Silvio Pietroluongo, vice president of charts and data development at Billboard, album equivalent units methodology "reflects album popularity in today's world, where music is accessible on so many platforms [and] has become the accepted measure of album success." Physical albums have mostly turned into collectors' items as noted by a 2016 poll by ICM Research, which found that nearly half of the surveyed people did not listen to the record they bought.

In Forbes, Hugh McIntyre noted that the usage of album equivalent units has made artists release albums with excessive track lists. Brian Josephs from Spin said: "If you're a thirsty (eager for fame or notoriety) pop artist of note, you can theoretically game the system by packing as many as 20 tracks into an album, in the process rolling up more album-equivalent units—and thus album "sales"—as listeners check the album out." He also criticized Chris Brown's album Heartbreak on a Full Moon which contains over 40 songs.

Rolling Stone columnist Tim Ingham observed the figures of Drake's Scorpion and found that 63% of the album's streams on Spotify came from just three songs off the 25-track album. Additionally, only six songs accounted for 82% of the album's total stream, meaning that only a quarter of the songs determining the overall success of the album in terms of album-equivalent unit. Cherie Hu from NPR felt that album equivalent units often don't reflect actual album because they put further weight on an album's biggest single(s) rather than on all the project's tracks as a whole.

See also

Album sales

References

Albums
Music industry
Equivalent units
Units of amount of substance